Leninskoye is a rural locality (a selo) and the administrative center of Leninsky Selsoviet of Arkharinsky District, Amur Oblast, Russia. The population was 299 as of 2018. There are 9 streets.

Geography 
Leninskoye is located near the left bank of the Arkhara River, 30 km southwest of Arkhara (the district's administrative centre) by road. Volnoye is the nearest rural locality.

References 

Rural localities in Arkharinsky District
Arkharinsky District